John Patrick McGarr (September 25, 1964 – March 25, 2010) was an American actor and film producer.

Biography

Early life
McGarr was born in Woodside, Queens, New York and attended Corpus Christi Grammar School. His parents were Maryann Allen from Woodside, New York and Eben Ray McGarr Sr. from Duncan, Oklahoma. He had two sisters and two brothers. John attended Aviation High School in Long Island City, Queens. He attended Queensboro College in Flushing, Queens.

Acting career
In addition to many television and film appearances, John McGarr was also a stand up comedian, having appeared in Las Vegas, Los Angeles and New York comedy clubs. His concentration was on classic horror films and was a participant in many Horror Conventions across the country. He moved to Los Angeles, California in 1994 and began appearing in movies and performing stand up comedy. He became a regular guest on Talkshow with Spike Feresten.

Producing career
McGarr became a noted producer when he formed My Way Pictures. My Way Pictures produces indie films working closely with the project developers to obtain their desired outcome. He worked on award-winning films such as Sick Girl, which won the Best feature award at the Phoenix Fear Film Festival in 2008, and House of the Wolf Man.

Death
While in Indianapolis on March 25, 2010 filming a documentary at the Horror Hound Convention, McGarr was struck by an automobile as he walked down the street and was killed by the drunk driver, Charles Beasley, at 10:30 am; he died instantly. McGarr was buried in St. John's Cemetery in Middle Village, New York.

Filmography

 Blockhead (2010)
 Shadows in Paradise (2010)
 House of the Wolf Man  (2009)
 Hotel California (2008)
 Your Name Here (2008)
 Sick Girl (2007)
 The Boys & Girls Guide to Getting Down (2006)
 Dead & Deader (2006)
 Night All Day (2000)
 Back to Back (1996)
 Wonderland (1997)

TV series
 Gene Simmons Family Jewels (2008)
 lonelygirl15  (2007)
 Talkshow with Spike Feresten (2006–2009)

Awards
Phoenix Fear Film Festival
Best feature: Sick Girl (2008)

References

External links
 

1964 births
2010 deaths
20th-century American male actors
21st-century American male actors
American male film actors
Film producers from New York (state)
American male television actors
Male actors from New York City
Road incident deaths in Indiana
People from Woodside, Queens